Upperville United Methodist Church is a historic church in Upperville, Virginia, United States, on Delaplane Grade Road, just off U.S. Route 50. The single-room church is a brick structure built in 1833, with 15-foot-high windows on its side. During the Civil War, it was used as a hospital, as were many other local churches. Originally, the church had a slave balcony wrapping around its whole length, but the balcony was destroyed during the war to use for firewood, and was later partially rebuilt. The cornerstone near the top of the building reads "METHODIST E. CHURCH. DEDICATED NOVEMBER 3, 1833."

The church is part of the Upperville Historic District, which was added to the National Register of Historic Places in 1972.

External links
 Upperville United Methodist Church

National Register of Historic Places in Fauquier County, Virginia
Churches on the National Register of Historic Places in Virginia
United Methodist churches in Virginia
Churches completed in 1833